Tallgrass most frequently refers to the native North American grasslands Tallgrass prairie.

Tallgrass may also refer to:


Companies
 Tallgrass Beef Company, Kansas-based beef company
 Tallgrass Brewing Company, Kansas's largest brewery based in Manhattan, KS
 Tallgrass Energy Partners, an oil company
 Tallgrass Technologies Corporation, acquired by Exabyte in 1993, sold computer tape backup systems

Locations
 Tallgrass Prairie National Preserve, a United States  National Preserve  located in the Flint Hills  region of Kansas
 Tallgrass Prairie Preserve, owned and managed by The Nature Conservancy in Osage County, Oklahoma
 Midewin National Tallgrass Prairie, operated by the United States Forest Service near Elwood, Illinois
 Tallgrass Aspen Parkland, a Conservation area  located in southeastern Manitoba /northwestern Minnesota
 Northern Tallgrass Prairie National Wildlife Refuge, a refuge in northern Minnesota and Iowa

Other uses
 Tallgrass (band), an American music trio
 Tallgrass Film Festival, annual film festival held in Wichita, Kansas